Events in the year 2017 in Nepal.

Incumbents
President: Bidhya Devi Bhandari 
Vice President: Nanda Kishor Pun
Prime Minister: previously Pushpa Kamal Dahal and currently Sher Bahadur Deuba
Chief Justice: Sushila Karki (until 9 June), Gopal Prasad Parajauli (starting 9 June)

Events

May
 May 14 - First phase of Local elections.
 May 27 - Summit Air Flight 409 crashes on final approach at Lukla Airport.

June
 June 28 - Second phase of Local elections.

August
 August 7/8 - Partial Lunar eclipse visible from entire Nepal.
 August 10–14 - Monsoon Floods lead to death of about 150 people in southern districts of Nepal.

September
 September 18 - Third phase of Local elections.

October
 October 14 - Tenure of Legislature Parliament ends.

November
 November 26 – First round of the legislative election.

December
 December 7 – Second round of the legislative election

Deaths

14 January – Yama Buddha, rapper (b. 1987).
6 May – Min Bahadur Sherchan, mountaineer (b. 1931)
6 May – Marshall Julum Shakya, politician (b. 1939)
14 July – Ram Hari Joshi, former minister and founding member of Nepali Congress (b. 1928)
11 November – Kirti Nidhi Bista, 25th Prime Minister of Nepal (b. 1927)

References

 
2010s in Nepal
Years of the 21st century in Nepal
Nepal
Nepal